Marie "Rie" Gerarda Cornelia Knipscheer (1911-2003) was a Dutch artist.

Biography 
Knipscheer was born on 6 April 1911 in Amsterdam. She attended the Instituut voor Kunstnijverheidsonderwijs (Institute for Applied Arts Education now the Gerrit Rietveld Academie) and the  Rijksakademie van beeldende kunsten (State Academy of Fine Arts). Her teachers included Johannes Hendricus Jurres and Hendrik Jan Wolter. She was married to J. Rooker. Her work was included in the 1939 exhibition and sale Onze Kunst van Heden (Our Art of Today) at the Rijksmuseum in Amsterdam. She was a member of Arti et Amicitiae and 

Knipscheer died on 3 February 2003 in Laren, North Holland.

References

External links
images of Knipscheer's work on Invaluable

1911 births
2003 deaths
Artists from Amsterdam
20th-century Dutch women artists